The MLBB M3 World Championship, commonly known as M3 or the M3 World Championships was the third edition of the Mobile Legends World Championships, an esports tournament for the game Mobile Legends: Bang Bang. It was held from December 6 until its Grand Finals on December 19, 2021 in Suntec Singapore Convention and Exhibition Centre in Singapore.

Background 
M3 is the third series of the Mobile Legends World Championship and is held on the same year as the second series was held in the same nation. M3 features 16 teams with each qualifying for their regional or national qualifiers known as the Mobile Legends: Bang Bang Professional League or MPL. These teams were all announced on the same day with its roster on November 25, 2021. M3 features 11 Asian Teams, 1 North American Team, 1 Arabian-Region Team and 3 Latin American Teams.

Coronavirus 
The COVID-19 pandemic, was a severe challenge for the organizers of the World Championships as the venue in Singapore provided strict health regulations provided by the Government as well as the players travelling from abroad. However, on August 8, 2021, Moonton, the developer of the game Mobile Legends: Bang Bang announced and confirmed that M3 will be happening by the end of 2021.

Qualified teams and rosters

Qualified teams 
Qualifying for the M3 World Championships comes from the competing nation's Mobile Legends: Bang Bang Professional League or commonly known as "MPL". However, regional qualifiers in the CIS Region, North America, Arabia and Latin American regions were also held to broaden the reach of the Championship's teams.

The defending World Champions in Bren Esports would not be redeeming to repeat back-to-back championship titles due to them having a non-playoff contention in MPL Philippines Season 8 that was ultimately won by Blacklist International in 5 games.

Rosters 
 Player did not play games

Group Draw 
The Group Draw was held on November 6, 2021, exactly one month before the tournament began, the sixteen teams that qualified for the global tournament were grouped into 4 groups of 4 teams each.

Format 
 Group Stage: December 6–9, 2021
 16 teams qualified for the event are split into four groups of 4 teams each.
 All matches in the group stage are played in a  series.
 The top two teams per group qualified for the Upper Bracket Playoffs
 The bottom two teams per group qualified for the Lower Bracket Playoffs
 Playoffs: December 11–19, 2021
 Sixteen teams play in a double-elimination tournament.
 Eight teams begin in the Upper Bracket, eight teams begin in the Lower Bracket.
 Lower Bracket Rounds 1 and 2 are a  series, the rest of the playoffs were a  series, except for the Grand Final, which was a  series.

Group Stage 
The Group Stages commenced on December 6 and concluded on December 9, 2021. All games in the group stage were in a  format. There were no teams eliminated at the end of group stages, but the upper two teams in each group qualified for the Upper Bracket playoffs, while the lower two qualified for the Lower Bracket Playoffs.

Group A

Tiebreaker 
As there had a three-way tie in Group A, Bedel was placed in the Tiebreaker final as they had the fastest time in games won. Thus, Red Canids and Malvinas Gaming played in the Tiebreaker semifinals which loser of that match qualified for the lower bracket.

Group B

Group C

Group D

Playoffs 
The first two rounds of the Lower Bracket are a Best-of-three series, the rest of the playoffs are a Best-of-five series, except the Grand Final which was a best-of-7 series.

Bracket

Lower Bracket 
The Lower-Bracket showed an elimination round of teams during the Third Day of the Playoffs.

With the win of Blacklist International against BTK, they advanced to the Grand Finals, making M3 the first World Tournament to be contested by the two Philippine representatives of MPL Philippines Season 8 and making the Philippines the first and, so far, only nation to win Back-to-Back World Titles for Mobile Legends: Bang Bang. The Other team would be Bren Esports who won the M2 World Title in the same year.

Grand Finals 
With ONIC Philippines and Blacklist International in the Grand Finals, it would be the second rematch between both teams after both teams were the eventual runner-up and Champions of MPL Philippines Season 8. The Grand Finals was held on December 19, 2021.

Game 1 

Game 1 of M3 began with the introduction of the players and rosters of both teams. Blacklist International with their Championship Lineup and the "Death Lineup" called by ONIC Philippines that led them in a 9-0 contest in the Upper-Bracket.

With an early lead in the Early Stages of the Game, ONIC Philippines was destined to win the matchup after the first turtle take was immediately stolen by Kairi, however, with the amazing defense that Blacklist International brought, they would lead the series 1–0 against ONIC with Marksman OHEB with the Clint as the MVP.

Reference:

Game 2 

Game 2 would merely shape the same drafting of heroes' in the hero pool yet changed with some tactics and plans laid down by both Coaches Yeb and Bon Chan of ONIC and Blacklist, respectively. With a great early game lead take by ONIC Philippines, it would immediately be a turnout same as Game Number 1 as the Beatrix in OHEB began to increase its damage, severely damaging the tactics of ONIC Philippines. Blacklist International would eventually take Game 2 against ONIC.

Reference:

Game 3 

Going for a double marksman-lineup, Blacklist International was easily taking the lead in the early game. Yet with the counter from Baloyskie's Lolita, it seemed that it will try and close the gap of Blacklist's lead in the early game. With the first Turtle going for Kairi and the second turtle on Wise, it stays at a close match.

8 minutes into the game, ONIC Philippines made an impressive diversion play on the bottom lane after killing three out of five of Blacklist's players. With back-and-forth lead takes by both teams, Blacklist International would inevitably win Game 3 and will be needing only one more game to win the title.

Reference:

Game 4 

With a 3–0 lead, Blacklist is destined to finish the series in only 4 games yet ONIC PH would simply try to draft out Blacklist in the process, stealing the Barats and the Pharsa picks from both Wise and Hadji, respectively, as well as putting more defense and damage by Natalia. However, Blacklist would stick to the double-marksman strategy from Game 3 after the banning of Uranus of Dlarskie.

With a great damage output by the Natan-core led by Wise, alongside the impressive defense on the outer-turrets by Blacklist International, they were able to finish the series in a 4–0 series sweep, the first World Championship sweep by any team in the history of MLBB World. Alongside making history for making the Philippines the first and only so-far, nation to hold back-to-back Championship titles in the M-Series. Alongside named as the "Filipino Sniper" in OHEB being crowned as Finals MVP.

Reference:

Reference:

 MVP of the Match

Final standings

Controversy 
On 23 December 2021, circulating on Facebook was the hashtag "#WeWantEstes" that was ultimately a protest hashtag by the MLBB Filipino community to Moonton for their cancellation on the creation of the Estes skin, previously picked by Finals MVP OHEB for it was their trademark hero ever since they competed in M3 alongside MPL Philippines. On the same day, Moonton released a statement stating that "We would like to clarify that the M3 Champion Skin has not yet been determined, and development is still underway".

Fans of Blacklist International, whom are the champions of M3, were angered and flustered about the cancellation of the Estes skin picked by the team as it was stated by player OhMyV33NUS that the Estes skin would may be cancelled after Moonton denied the creation of an Estes skin because it was not "marketable". Moonton has asked him three different and alternative heroes that can ultimately be Estes' replacement which was the Beatrix, Yi Sun-Shin and Mathilda. All three trademark heroes of Blacklist International.

Ultimately on 24 December, meeting with the creative management of Moonton, alongside Tier One Entertainment's co-founders in Alodia Gosiengfiao and Tryke Gutierrez, Estes would be the official M3 Championship hero that will obtain a skin by the team of Blacklist International. The announcement came with the hashtag "#WeChooseEstes".

References 

Mobile Legends: Bang Bang competitions
World championships in esports
2021 in Singaporean sport
International sports competitions hosted by Singapore
Esports competitions in Singapore